The Three Doctors is a group of African-American motivational speakers, authors, and doctors.

Origins 
The trio is made up of Dr. Rameck Hunt, Dr. Sampson Davis, and Dr. George Jenkins. All three grew up in Newark, New Jersey without fathers and first met as schoolmates at University High School. The three grew up in public housing and came from low-income families. During high school, the three made a pact to get through high school, college, and medical school successfully and credit school counselor Carla Dickson with guiding them through their tumultuous teenage years. They attended the pre-medicine/pre-dental course at Seton Hall University on a scholarship program.

Rameck Hunt 
Hunt's mother was a drug addict, and he was mostly raised by his grandmother. He struggled through school, frequently getting into trouble and had anger management issues. While in high school he befriended Davis and Jenkins and resolved to turn his life around. After completing premedical studies at Seton Hall University, he attended Robert Wood Johnson Medical School (RWJMS), then part of the University of Medicine and Dentistry of New Jersey, and completed his residency in internal medicine at Robert Wood Johnson University Hospital. He is currently a board-certified internist at University Medical Center of Princeton and an assistant professor at RWJMS.

Sampson Davis 
Davis, the fifth of six children, grew up in a neighborhood notorious for crime and drugs. He excelled in school and has said that education "saved his life". Like Hunt, he completed medical school at RWJMS. He then completed his residency in emergency medicine at Newark Beth Israel Medical Center, where he is now an attending physician.

George Jenkins 
Jenkins was born on February 6, 1973, in Newark. He was inspired to become a dentist after a visit to the dentist's office for braces when he was a teenager. After undergraduate studies at Seton Hall, he completed his D.M.D. at University of Medicine and Dentistry of New Jersey. He is an assistant professor of clinical dentistry at Columbia University.

Speaking 
The members of the group rarely speak individually; they usually speak as a group. They speak throughout the United States at different venues and times of the year.  They also accept requests to speak at private venues, such as schools.

Books

See also
The Pact (2006 film)

External links
The Three Doctors Foundation website

References 

American motivational speakers
American motivational writers
Youth activists
African-American writers
African-American physicians
Physicians from New Jersey
Seton Hall University alumni
Writers from Newark, New Jersey
Trios
Physicians from Newark, New Jersey